Anthony Charles Wilson Lewis (born 29 September 1932) is a former English cricketer. Lewis was a right-handed batsman. He was born at Newcastle-under-Lyme, Staffordshire and educated at Repton School.

Lewis made his debut for Staffordshire in the 1950 Minor Counties Championship against Durham. He made a further appearance for the county in 1953 against Durham. While attending the University of Cambridge, Lewis made his first-class debut for Cambridge University Cricket Club against the Free Foresters in 1952. He made five further first-class appearances for the university, the last of which came against Sussex in 1953. In his six first-class matches, he scored a total of 83 runs at an average of 9.22, with a high score of 55. This score came on debut against the Free Foresters, and was the only time he passed double figures in any match.

References

External links
 Anthony Lewis at ESPNcricinfo
 Anthony Lewis at CricketArchive

1932 births
Living people
Sportspeople from Newcastle-under-Lyme
People educated at Repton School
Alumni of the University of Cambridge
English cricketers
Staffordshire cricketers
Cambridge University cricketers